is the nineteenth single by Japanese recording artist Alisa Mizuki. It was released on August 23, 2000 as the second single from Mizuki's fourth compilation album History: Alisa Mizuki Complete Single Collection.

The title track was written and produced by Tsunku, whose background vocals are featured in the choruses of the song. The song served as theme song for the second half (episodes 15-24) of the third season of the Fuji TV drama Nurse no Oshigoto, starring Mizuki herself. The single also includes the B-side "Believe in Your Way," written by Yūko Ebine and Kazuhiro Hara and composed and produced by Hara, and a remix of "Megami no Mai" by Chokkaku.

Chart performance 
"Megami no Mai" debuted on the Oricon Weekly Singles chart at number 20 with 17,230 copies sold in its first week. The single charted for four weeks and has sold a total of 32,740 copies.

Track listing

Charts and sales

References 

2000 singles
Alisa Mizuki songs
Japanese television drama theme songs
Song recordings produced by Tsunku
Songs written by Tsunku
2000 songs